Ernesto Screpanti (born 1948, in Rome) is a professor of Political Economy at the University of Siena. He worked on the “rethinking Marxism” research programme, in the attempt to update Marxist analysis by bringing it in line with the reality of contemporary capitalism, on the one hand, and to liberate Marxism from any residue of Hegelian metaphysics, Kantian ethics and economic determinism, on the other.

Theory 

He formulated a general theory of capitalism by which the fundamental institution of this mode of production is not private property but the employment contract, intended as an institution that generates an authority relationship enabling capitalists to subject and exploit the workers. Capitalism may take various forms, all of which have the above-mentioned fundamental institution in common, but vary depending on the ways in which different property rights regimes and accumulation governance structures are combined.

In dynamic analysis Screpanti criticized the so-called “laws of movement of capitalist development” as formulated by Marx, because of their deterministic implications as philosophies of history and the analytic limitations of some of their assumptions. He put forward a theory of  development as an evolutionary process of a cyclical kind, coupling long and short run periodicity factors, both of which are determined by the dynamics of class conflict and income distribution. 
In a more concrete analysis of contemporary capitalism, Screpanti formulated the theory of “global imperialism”, which defines a governance system of world accumulation that cannot be understood with the traditional theories of imperialism. The fundamental imperialist contradiction is between the centre and the periphery of the global economy, not among the imperial states. There is no dominating imperial centre; there is instead a plurality of national, international, governmental, non-governmental, public and private agencies that contribute to accumulation governance on a world scale through a sort of competitive cooperation.

As to the theory of communism, Screpanti proposed a re-reading of Marx and Engels as libertarian theorists. Freedom is defined as the real capacity of individuals to make choices. Following Gramsci’s approach, enriched with the achievements of current theory on the freedom of choice,  this is intended as a magnitude determined by the opportunity sets available to individuals. Freedom of choice is not distributed equally in capitalism: it is practically nil for the workers and at its greatest for capitalists in the production process; it is negligible in the poor social strata and very large for the privileged classes in the consumption sphere. Communism is seen as a conflicting process of historical transformation in which the oppressed and exploited classes struggle for the redistribution of freedom.

Works
 Global Imperialism and the Great Crisis: The Uncertain Future of Capitalism. Monthly Review Press, 2014.  (paperback);  (cloth)
 "Freedom of Choice in the Production Sphere: The Capitalist and the Self-Managed Firm", in "Review of Political Economy", 2011, forthcoming.
 "Globalization and the Great Crisis", in "The Global Economic Crisis: New Persepectives on the Critique of Economic Theory and Policy", edited by E. Brancaccio and G. Fontana, London: Routledge, 2011.
 "A Quasi Natural Measure of Choice Freedom for Budget- and Time-Constrained Opportunity Sets", in "Metroeconomica", 2009.
 "Taxation, Social Goods, and the Distribution of Freedom", in "Metroeconomica", 2006.
 "Value and Exploitation: A Counterfactual Approach, in "Review of Political Economy", n. 1, 2003.
 The Fundamental Institutions of Capitalism,  London: Routledge, 2001.
 "Wages, Employment and Militancy: A Simple Model and Some Empirical Tests", in “Review of Radical Political Economics”, 2000.
 "The Postmodern Crisis in Economics and the Revolution against Modernism", in “Rethinking Marxism”, 2000.
 "Capitalist Forms and the Essence of Capitalism", in “Review of International Political Economy”, vol. 6, n. 1, 1999.
 "Banks, Increasing Risk, and the Endogenous Money supply", in “Economic Notes”, vol. 26, n. 3, 1997.
 "Epistemic Relativism, the Postmodern Turn in Economics, and the History of Economic Thought", in “History of Economic Ideas”, vol. 2, 1995.
 "Sraffa after Marx: a New Interpretation", in "Review of Political Economy", vol V, n.1, 1993.
 "Monetary Dynamics, Speculation, and the Term Structure of Interest Rates", in "Economic Notes", n.2, 1989.
 "Long Cycles in Strike Activity: an Empirical Investigation", in "British Journal of Industrial Relations", XXV, n.1, 1987.
 "Long Economic Cycles and Recurring Proletarian Insurgencies",in "Review of the F.Braudel Center", New York State University, VII, n.3, 1984.

References

External links 
 Ernesto Screpanti's Official Website
 Ernesto Screpanti, Department of Economics, University of Siena
 Ernesto Screpanti at IDEAS
 Ernesto Screpanti: Who, What, When, Where 
 Ernesto Screpanti at EconPapers

1948 births
Living people
Italian economists
Marxian economists
Writers from Rome
Academic staff of the University of Siena